Tangaloa was an important family of gods in Tongan mythology. The first Tangaloa was the cousin of Havea Hikuleo and Maui, or in some sources the brother or son or father of them. He was Tangaloa Eiki (T. lord), and was assigned by his father, Taufulifonua, the realm of the sky to rule.

Among his offspring the following are found: Tangaloa Tamapoulialamafoa, Tangaloa Eitumātupua, Tangaloa Atulongolongo, and Tangaloa Tufunga. But different sources disagree about the exact family relations between any Tangaloa. Tangaloa Tufunga (T. carpenter) was known as an adze maker. Tangaloa Eitumātupua is known in Samoa as Tagaloa Eitumatupua (T. ghost and riddle; an eitu or aitu is a second rank god of somewhat malevolent nature).

Eitumātupua
A big toa ('ironwood tree) reaching into the sky grew on the island of Toonangakava between Mataaho and Talakite. Tangaloa Eitumātupua climbed down from the sky and saw a beautiful woman shellfishing. Her name was Ilaheva also known as Vaepopua for the village where she came from. They cohabitated and the god went back up. He returned and they slept and he went up, many times. One day they overslept and a tern flying over saw them and woke them up. Therefore one island is called Tala-kite (tern-see) and the other Mata-aho (Eye-of-day).

Ilaheva became pregnant and bore a son. After a while the god returned down from the sky and told her to name him Ahoeitu (day has dawned). Then, when the woman answered him that her place was sandy, he said he would throw some clay down from the sky so she could make a plantation for their child. So the hill Holohiufi (pour the yam) was made and the heketala (slip tern, a kind of yam) was planted. Then the god did no longer return.

Ahoeitu grew up and became curious about his father. His mother told him the truth and let him climb the giant toa. In the heavens he found his father and he found he had elder stepbrothers. They did not like him and killed him, but his father resurrected him. Then he spoke that Ahoeitu should go down to earth where he would become the first Tuʻi Tonga (from divine descent) to replace the Tui Tonga which came from the maggots of Kohai, Koau, mo Momo. 
Because of their murder his elder brothers, if they wanted to go down too, would have to serve him.

See also
Tangaloa, (or a variant of this name conforming to the local vernacular) is found in many other Polynesian mythologies. He may have exchanged functions with his cousins Hikuleo and Maui, or other gods seemingly at random in different places.
In Samoa as Tagaloa.
In Mangaia as Tangaroa.
In Manihiki as Tangaroa keeper of fire.
In Hawaii as Kanaloa, symbolized by the squid or hee.
In Tahiti as Ta'aroa.
In Marquesas Islands, as Tanaoa or Takaoa.
In Aotearoa as Tangaroa god of the sea.

Notes

References
 E.W. Gifford, Tongan myths and tales, BPB Bulletin 8, 1924
 R.D. Craig, Dictionary of Polynesian Mythology (Greenwood Press: New York, 1989), 100.

Tongan deities
Sky and weather gods